Amasa (עמשא) or Amessai 
is a person mentioned in the Hebrew Bible. His mother was Abigail, a sister of King David. Hence, Amasa was a nephew of David, and cousin of Joab, David's military commander, as well as a cousin of Absalom, David's son. David calls him "my bone and my flesh". Amasa's father was Jether who was also called Ithra.

When Absalom rebelled against David and won over the tribes of Israel, he appointed Amasa as commander over the army, in effect replacing Joab, who had served as commander for David.

After the revolt was crushed and Absalom died, David was invited back to Jerusalem and restored as king. David re-appointed Amasa "from now on" as his military commander in place of Joab. The New International Version translates the Hebrew text as commander "for life".

David's appointment of Amasa has been interpreted as "a bold stroke of policy, to promise the post of commander-in chief to the general of the rebel army".

While being fiercely loyal to David, Joab was also suspicious of any potential rivals for Joab's power or threats to David's kingdom, and had no qualms about taking the lives of any who might stand in his way (e.g., Abner: ,). So it was not difficult for Joab to also decide to murder Amasa. Joab's own justification for killing Amasa may have been because  he believed Amasa to be conspiring with Sheba son of Bichri the Benjamite, due to Amasa's slowness to mobilize the army against Sheba's rebels.

References

Family of David
Ancient soldiers